Robert Clayton Shantz (born September 26, 1925) is an American former professional baseball player. He played as a left-handed pitcher in Major League Baseball (MLB) from  through , and won the 1952 American League Most Valuable Player Award as a member of the Philadelphia Athletics. A three-time All-Star, Shantz won eight consecutive Gold Glove Awards and won a World Series championship with the 1958 New York Yankees.

He also played for the Pittsburgh Pirates, Houston Colt .45s, St. Louis Cardinals, Chicago Cubs, and the  Philadelphia Phillies. Shantz began his career as a starting pitcher, but about halfway through he converted to a competent relief pitcher. In 1951, he added the knuckleball to his repertoire. Standing only , Shantz had a career record of 119 games won, 99 games lost, and an earned run average (ERA) of 3.38.

Career
Shantz enjoyed his best season in 1952 when he led the American League in wins (24) and won the MVP Award. In the process, he led the A's to a 79–75 record and fourth-place finish in the American League, their last winning season in Philadelphia. In a September 1952 game, Shantz's left wrist was broken after he was hit by a pitch thrown by Walt Masterson. The following season, Shantz injured his shoulder in a game against the Boston Red Sox. Shantz saw only limited action for the rest of 1953 and pitched only eight innings in 1954. After the 1954 season was complete, the Athletics were sold and moved to Kansas City for the 1955 season.

In 1957, Shantz was traded to the New York Yankees as part of a 13-player deal. He led the league in ERA in his first year with the Yankees, but was never a regular starting pitcher afterwards.

A highly skilled fielder, Shantz won eight consecutive Gold Glove Awards from 1957 to 1964 (American League, 1957–60; National League, 1961–64; in 1957 the award was rendered for both leagues). Shantz also was selected for the All-Star Game in 1951, 1952 and 1957. In the fifth and final inning of the 1952 All Star Game, the left–handed Shantz exhibited his distinctive sidearm delivery and sharp curve and control and struck out three consecutive National League hitters: Whitey Lockman, Jackie Robinson and Stan Musial.

Shantz appeared in relief three games each in the 1957 and 1960 World Series with the Casey Stengel managed New York Yankees.

Shantz had the distinction of being selected in expansion drafts in consecutive seasons. He was selected in the 1960 MLB expansion draft by the Washington Senators from the New York Yankees, and in the 1961 MLB expansion draft by the Colt .45s from the Pittsburgh Pirates.

In his 16-year major league career, Shantz recorded a .195 batting average (107-for-548) with 60 runs, 20 doubles, 1 home run, 46 RBI and 47 bases on balls. Defensively, he posted a .976 fielding percentage which was 19 points higher than the league average at his position.

He is the brother of former Major League catcher Billy Shantz.  He is the oldest living former player of the Chicago Cubs, Houston Astros, and Philadelphia Phillies organizations. He is also the oldest living player to have won a Most Valuable Player Award.

See also
 List of Major League Baseball annual ERA leaders
 List of Major League Baseball annual wins leaders
 Sporting News Pitcher of the Year Award

References

Further reading
 Mercury staff (May 27, 1952). "Shantz Night' Is Set July 18". The Pottsdown Mercury. p. 16

External links

Bobby Shantz at SABR (Baseball BioProject)
Bobby Shantz at Astros Daily

1925 births
Living people
American League All-Stars
American League ERA champions
American League Most Valuable Player Award winners
American League wins champions
American people of German descent
Baseball players from Pennsylvania
Chicago Cubs players
Gold Glove Award winners
Houston Colt .45s players
Kansas City Athletics players
Knuckleball pitchers
Lincoln A's players
Major League Baseball pitchers
New York Yankees players
People from Pottstown, Pennsylvania
Philadelphia Athletics players
Philadelphia Phillies players
Pittsburgh Pirates players
St. Louis Cardinals players
Sportspeople from Montgomery County, Pennsylvania